Sarah Price is a Christian fiction novelist and adult and children's author of over 40 books.
Much of her writing focuses on the Anabaptist heritage and the Old Order Amish. Her paternal grandparents, Sarah Marie Alderfer and Harlan Nice, were born into an Old Order Mennonite Church in Pennsylvania in the early 1900s. With her Anabaptist upbringing, Price was drawn to the culture of the Amish of Lancaster County where she has connections with Amish communities.

Most recently, Price has adapted the Jane Austen books into an Amish setting.

She went to Drew University in Madison, New Jersey to study anthropology and holds three other advanced degrees.

Price is married with children. She lives in Morristown, New Jersey.

Awards 
Price is a nationally recognized best-selling novelist. She’s been numerous times on the ECPA best sellers list  and Amazon’s Top 100 authors’ list in 2013, 2014, and 2015.

List of works 
The following collection of listed books have been published by Realms, an imprint of Charisma House Publishers:

The Amish Classics 

 First Impressions, May 2014
 The Matchmaker, February 2015
 Second Chances, May 2015
 Sense and Sensibility, March 2016

Other Books 

 Secret Sister: An Amish Christmas Tale, October 2015

The following collection of listed books have been published by Waterfall Press, an imprint of Brilliance Audio, Amazon Publishing.

The Plain Fame Series 

 Plain Fame, September 2015 (originally self-published in 2012; Amazon Top 100 best seller)
 Plain Change, September 2015 (originally self-published in 2012; Amazon Top 100 best seller)
 Plain Again, September 2015 (originally self-published in 2013)
 Plain Return, October 2015
 Plain Choice, March 2016

Other Books 

 An Amish Buggy Ride, November 2014
 An Empty Cup, April 2015—Amazon Top 100 Best Seller

Self-Published Books

The Amish of Lancaster Series 

 Fields of Corn, December 2007
 Hills of Wheat, January 2012
 Pastures of Faith, March 2012
 Valley of Hope, December 2012

The Tomato Patch Series 

 The Tomato Patch, July 2012
 The Quilting Bee, October 2012
 The Hope Chest, February 2013
 The Clothes Line, July 2013

Amish Seasons 

 An Amish Spring, March 2015
 An Amish Summer, June 2015
 An Amish Autumn, July 2015
 An Amish Winter, July 2015

Other Books 

 An Amish Christmas Carol, December 2012
 Amish Circle Letters, January 2014
 Amish Circle Letters II, February 2014
 Amish Faith, November 2013
 A Christmas Gift for Rebecca, February 2014
 A Gift of Faith, December 2013
 Gypsy in Black, July 2011
 Meet Me in Heaven, January 2013 (with Ella Stewart)
 Plain & Simple Traditions: Amish & Mennonite Holidays, December 2014
 Pink Umbrellas: The 12 Days of Devotion, November 2013 (with Lisa Bull)
 Postcards from Abby, August 2012 (with Ella Stewart)

References

External links
 Review of The Amish Cookie Club Courtship, Publishers Weekly
 Interview with Price in Not Quite Amish, 2014
 Interview with Price at Laughing with Lizzie blog, 2015

Living people
20th-century American novelists
21st-century American novelists
20th-century American women writers
21st-century American women writers
American women novelists
Christian writers
Drew University alumni
People from Morristown, New Jersey
Year of birth missing (living people)